Karna Madhabpur is a village in Barrackpore II CD Block in Barrackpore subdivision of North 24 Parganas district in the state of West Bengal, India. It is close to Kolkata and also a part of Kolkata Urban Agglomeration.

Geography

Location
Khardaha, Bandipur, Bilkanda and Nilganj are located nearby.

96% of the population of Barrackpore subdivision (partly presented in the map alongside, all places marked in the map is linked in the full screen map) lives in urban areas. In 2011, it had a density of population of 10,967 per km2. The subdivision has 16 municipalities and 24 census towns.

For most of the cities/ towns information regarding density of population is available in the Infobox. Population data is not available for neighbourhoods. It is available for the entire Municipal area and thereafter ward-wise.

Police station
Khardaha police station under Barrackpore Police Commissionerate has jurisdiction over Khardaha Municipal area and 
Barrackpore II CD Block.

CD Block HQ
The headquarters of Barrackpore II CD Block is at Karna Madhabpur.

Demographics
As per the 2011 Census of India, Karna Madhabpur had a total population of 3,088, of which 1,592 (52%) were males and 1,496 (48%) were females. Population below 6 years was 321. The total number of literates in Karna Madhabpur was 2,313 (83.59% of the population over 6 years).

Transport
Kalyani Expressway runs through Karna Madhabpur.

Bus

Private Bus
 56 Ruiya Purbapara - Howrah Station

WBTC Bus
 AC10 Nilganj - Howrah Station

Train
Both Sodepur railway station and Khardaha railway station on the Sealdah-Ranaghat line are located nearby.

Education
Elitte Institute of Engineering and Management was established at PO Karna Madhabpur in 2009. It offers diploma (3-years) courses in automobile, civil, electronics & telecommunication, electrical and mechanical engineering, computer science & technology, and hotel management & catering technology.

Healthcare
Block Primary Health Centre at Bandipur is located nearby.

References

Villages in North 24 Parganas district